Ashcraft v. Tennessee may refer to:

 Ashcraft v. Tennessee (1944), 322 U.S. 143, the Supreme Court reversed two convictions based on coerced confessions
 Ashcraft v. Tennessee (1946), 327 U.S. 274